Joseph Mohsen Béchara (19 March 1935 – 9 June 2020) was a Maronite archbishop of the Maronite Catholic Archeparchy of Cyprus and the Maronite Catholic Archeparchy of Antelias.

Life
Joseph Mohsen Béchara received on 19 April 1963 the sacrament of ordination to the priesthood. On 4 April 1986, the was appointed by Pope John Paul II Archbishop of Archeparchy of Cyprus with headquarters in Nicosia. His episcopal ordination was on 18 May 1986 by the hands of the Maronite Patriarch of Antioch, Nasrallah Boutros Sfeir and his co-consecrators were the Archeparch of Jounieh, Chucrallah Harb, and the Auxiliary bishop of Antioch, Roland Aboujaoudé. On 11 June 1988, Béchara became the first Maronite Archbishop appointed to the Maronite Catholic Archeparchy of Antelias.

On 16 June 2012, Joseph Mohsen Béchara resigned for reasons of age from the Archbishopric of Antelias.

References

External links
 Archbishop Youssef Mohsen Béchara (Catholic-Hierarchy)

1935 births
2020 deaths
Lebanese clergy
20th-century Maronite Catholic bishops
Lebanese Maronites
People from Zgharta District
21st-century Maronite Catholic bishops